Wanjiru is a name of Kikuyu origin that may refer to:

The main character of a Kikuyu story, "Wanjiru, Sacrificed by Her People"
Daniel Wanjiru (born 1992), Kenyan long-distance runner
Esther Wanjiru (born 1977), Kenyan long-distance track and road runner and 1998 Commonwealth Games champion
Esther Wanjiru Mwikamba, Kenyan crime victim in Dubai in 2012
Helen Wanjiru Gichohi, Kenyan ecologist and President of the African Wildlife Foundation
Grace Wanjiru (born 1979), Kenyan race walker and four-time African champion
Margaret Wanjiru, Kenyan bishop and Member of the National Assembly for the Orange Democratic Movement
Samuel Wanjiru (1986–2011), Kenyan marathon runner and 2008 Olympic champion
Ruth Wanjiru (born 1981), Kenyan road runner based in Japan
Veronica Nyaruai Wanjiru (born 1989), Kenyan middle- and long-distance runner

See also
Wanjiku, similar Kenyan name

Kenyan names